The discography of German girl group No Angels consists of six studio albums, three compilation albums, two live albums, four video albums and more than twenty singles. The group sold over five million records before breaking up in 2003, making them one of the highest-selling German girl groups of all time.

In February 2001, the band released their debut single, "Daylight in Your Eyes," which reached number one in Germany for six consecutive weeks, and topped the charts in Austria and Switzerland. The group's debut album, Elle'ments, was released the following month and topped the German Albums Chart for three weeks, eventually being certified 7× gold. The album also reached number one in Austria and Switzerland, going platinum in both countries. The album spawned three more top ten singles, including a cover of Eurythmics' "There Must Be an Angel," another number one hit. The band's second album, Now... Us!, debuted and peaked at number one in Germany in June 2002. It produced four singles, two of which reached the top five in Germany, including their third number one single in Germany and Austria, "Something About Us". Preceded by their fourth number-one single, "No Angel (It's All in Your Mind)" and top five single "Someday", the group's third album, Pure, was released in August 2003. Their first album as a quartet, it was certified gold. The album spawned one more single, "Feelgood Lies", which reached number three in Germany. In September 2003, the group announced that they were splitting up and released one final album, The Best of No Angels, a greatest hits album with all of their singles, in December 2003. It peaked at number five in Germany for two weeks. 

No Angels re-formed in 2007 and released their fourth studio album, Destiny in April of the same year. Less successful than their previous albums, it peaked at number four in Germany, becoming their first studio album not to reach the top spot. Although the singles from Destiny failed to match the success of its preceders, it produced two top five hits with the comeback single "Goodbye to Yesterday" and the German entry for the Eurovision Song Contest 2008, "Disappear." The band's second post-reunion album, Welcome to the Dance, was released in September 2009. It peaked at number twenty-six, lasting two weeks in the German albums chart, and became their lowest-charting and selling album up to then. Its first and only single "One Life" peaked at number fifteen in Germany. In September 2010, band member Nadja Benaissa left the band, leaving No Angels as a trio before they went into another hiatus. In early 2021, the band reformed once more as a quartet, commemorating with their 2001 debut. Their sixth studio album 20, a collection of re-recordings and new songs, was released in June 2021 and became their four non-consecutive number-one album on the German Albums Chart.

Albums

Studio albums

Live albums

Compilation albums

Box sets

Singles

As featured artists

Notes

Video albums

Music videos

Other appearances
These songs have not appeared on a studio album released by No Angels.

References

External links
  
 
 

Disco
Discographies of German artists
Pop music group discographies